The East Division Street–Sheboygan Street Historic District is a residential historic district located in Fond du Lac, Wisconsin, United States. It was added to the National Register of Historic Places in 2010.

History
Contributing buildings in the district were constructed from 1852 to 1933. Houses include one designed by George Franklin Barber in the Queen Anne style.

References

Fond du Lac, Wisconsin
Houses on the National Register of Historic Places in Wisconsin
Houses in Fond du Lac County, Wisconsin
Historic districts on the National Register of Historic Places in Wisconsin
National Register of Historic Places in Fond du Lac County, Wisconsin